Vladislav Sozonov (born 9 October 1993) is a Russian rugby union player who generally plays as a wing represents Russia internationally.

He has 13 caps for Russia, since 2017, with 2 tries scored, 10 points on aggregate. He made his international debut against Hong Kong on 10 November 2017, in a 16-13 win.

He was included in the Russian squad for the 2019 Rugby World Cup which was held in Japan for the first time and also marked his first World Cup appearance. He had three caps at the competition, without scoring.

References

Russian rugby union players
Russia international rugby union players
Living people
1993 births
Sportspeople from Kyiv
Rugby union wings